Black Sky Aerospace (also known as BSA) is an Australian private aerospace company, headquartered in Jimboomba, Queensland, Australia. BSA specialises in payload delivery systems through proprietary propulsion systems, componentry and vehicles. Additionally, BSA provides access to calibration and simulation systems.

History 
In 2021, Black Sky Aerospace has welcomed the Federal Government's allocation of AU$678,487 for the company to manufacture Responsive Common Use Booster (RCUB) propellant for commercial use. Black Sky CEO Blake Nikolic said the project received grant funding from the Australian Space Agency's (ASA) Moon to Mars Supply Chain Capability Improvement grant opportunity.

Milestones

Australia's first commercial rocket launch 
On 21 November 2018, Black Sky Aerospace successfully conducted Australia's first commercial payload rocket launch from the nation's only sub-orbital launch facility west of Goondiwindi, Queensland, Australia. This sub-orbital mission utilised a Sighter190 research rocket to carry experimental payloads and instruments to an altitude of approximately 20,000-ft.

The minister for state development, manufacturing, infrastructure and planning, Cameron Dick was present to press the launch button.

Rocket motor manufacture 
In September 2019, Black Sky Aerospace was granted approval by regulators to begin manufacturing solid rocket motors. Solid rocket motors (SRM's) are the fuel (propellant) that boosts rockets in to space, such as the boosters on the space shuttle and is the preferred fuel to use by many space launch companies due to its simplicity and cost-effectiveness. The company will be the first manufacturer of its kind in Australia and will be able to provide access to solid fuels for orbital and sub-orbital launch vehicles.

Priority access to Arnhem Space Centre 
In October 2019, Black Sky Aerospace gained priority access to the new Equatorial Launch Australia (ELA) Arnhem Space Centre near Nhulunbuy in the Northern Territory. Black Sky Aerospace Director Blake Nikolic said priority access to the Arnhem Space Centre would provide his customers with the benefits of launching close to the equator.

Equatorial Launch Australia operates the Arnhem Space Centre, near Nhulunbuy, and as of 2019, planned to host NASA's first launch from a foreign non-government-owned site. The launch, of an astrophysics-oriented sounding rocket, successfully occurred on the morning of 27 June 2022, with a second scheduled for 4 July, and a third later in the month.

Products 
 Sighter190 research rocket

References

External links 
 Official website

Private spaceflight companies
Aerospace companies of Australia
Companies based in Queensland